Flaming Barriers is a 1924 American silent drama film directed by George Melford and written by Byron Morgan and Harvey F. Thew. The film stars Jacqueline Logan, Antonio Moreno, Walter Hiers, Charles Stanton Ogle, Robert McKim, Luke Cosgrave, and Warren Rogers. The film was released on January 27, 1924, by Paramount Pictures.

Plot
As described in a film magazine review, Joseph Pickens, a leading citizen of Burbridge, plans to control the invention of a fast motor fire truck, which old Patrick Malone is exploiting. Young Sam Barton comes to Malone's machine shop to work as an efficiency man. Sam falls in love with Malone's daughter Jerry and they have several adventures together. When a forest fire threatens Burbridge, Sam and Jerry drive the fire truck through the flames to save the town. Malone's invention brings him riches, the scheme of Pickens is defeated, and Sam wins the affections of Jerry.

Cast
Jacqueline Logan as Jerry Malone
Antonio Moreno as Sam Barton
Walter Hiers as Henry Van Sickle
Charles Stanton Ogle as Patrick Malone
Robert McKim as Joseph Pickens
Luke Cosgrave as Bill O'Halloran
Warren Rogers as Mayor Steers
Claribel Campbell

Preservation
With no prints of Flaming Barriers located in any film archives, it is a lost film.

References

External links

Still at www.alamy.com

1924 films
Silent American drama films
Lost American films
1924 drama films
Famous Players-Lasky films
1924 lost films
Paramount Pictures films
Films directed by George Melford
American black-and-white films
American silent feature films
1920s American films